Satyrium fuliginosum, the sooty hairstreak, is a butterfly of the family Lycaenidae. It is found in western North America from British Columbia to central California, east to Wyoming and northern Colorado.

Adults are on wing from July to August. Adults feed on flower nectar.

The larvae feed on Lupinus.

Subspecies
S. f. albolineatum Mattoon & Austin, 1998
S. f. fuliginosum
S. f. tildenia Mattoon & Austin, 1998

References

External links
Sooty hairstreak, Butterflies of Canada

Butterflies described in 1861
Satyrium (butterfly)
Butterflies of North America
Taxa named by William Henry Edwards